The Albion Ale House or The Albion is a Grade II listed public house in Conwy, North Wales. Built in 1921, it is a three-room pub with Art Nouveau decor that underwent major renovation in 2012. The Albion is jointly operated by four North Wales breweries and real ales from these breweries and other beers are served through eight hand pumps. The Albion Ale House was named the 2013 Wales Pub of the Year by the Campaign for Real Ale (CAMRA), and named one of the world's best bars by The Guardian.

The four breweries that co-run The Albion are Conwy Brewery of Llysfaen, Bragdy Nant of Llanrwst, Great Orme Brewery of Llandudno, and Purple Moose Brewery of Porthmadog.

History 
The Albion was built in 1921 on the site of a previous pub. By mid-2010 the ale house was not profitable and had fallen into disrepair. It was sold by its owner, Punch Taverns, to Arthur Ellis, a local businessman. The Albion remained closed for a year while renovation work was carried out at a total cost of £100,000. Ellis arranged for the four local breweries to co-operate in running the pub on its reopening.

The Albion Ale House reopened in February 2012. The renovated pub received the English Heritage Conservation Award in the 2014 CAMRA Pub Design Awards. The interior of the Albion appears on the cover of the Britain's Best Real Heritage Pubs guide published by CAMRA.

References

External links
 Albion Ale House website

Pubs in Wales
Grade II listed buildings in Conwy County Borough
Commercial buildings completed in 1921
Grade II listed pubs in Wales